Gospel Train can refer to:
 "The Gospel Train", a traditional African-American spiritual
 Gospel Train (album), a 1956 album by Sister Rosetta Tharpe